German submarine U-269 was a Type VIIC U-boat of Nazi Germany's Kriegsmarine during World War II. The U-boat was laid down on 18 September 1941 by Bremer Vulkan at Bremen-Vegesack, launched on 24 June 1942 and commissioned on 19 August under the command of Oberleutnant zur See Karl-Heinrich Harlfinger.

During its career the submarine failed to sink or damage any vessels, but neither did it lose any crew members prior to its sinking on 25 June 1944.

Design
German Type VIIC submarines were preceded by the shorter Type VIIB submarines. U-269 had a displacement of  when at the surface and  while submerged. She had two shafts and two  propellers.

U-269 was fitted with five  torpedo tubes (four fitted at the bow and one at the stern), fourteen torpedoes, one  SK C/35 naval gun, 220 rounds, and two twin  C/30 anti-aircraft guns. The boat had a complement of between forty-four and sixty.

Service history
After training with the 8th U-boat Flotilla in the Baltic Sea, U-269 was assigned to the 11th U-boat Flotilla based in Bergen, Norway.

U-269 first left Kiel on 16 March 1943 to operate from bases in Norway, carrying out two patrols in the Barents Sea in the summer of 1943, one under the command of Oberleutnant zur See Karl-Heinrich Harlfinger in March and April, and another under Oblt.z.S. Otto Hansen in July, August and September.

Reassigned to the 6th U-boat Flotilla, on 4 November 1943 the U-boat left Bergen for her third patrol in the Atlantic under the command of the newly promoted Kapitänleutnant Karl-Heinrich Harlfinger. On 1 December Allied forces attacked the U-boat, causing serious damage and forcing U-269 to abort her patrol. She reached St. Nazaire on the French Atlantic coast on the 15th.

In France, command was assumed by Oberleutnant zur See Georg Uhl, who made one short patrol in the Bay of Biscay in May 1944, then sailed from Brest on 6 June ("D-Day") to St. Peter Port, Guernsey, three days later sailing into the English Channel on her final patrol.

Sinking
U-269 was sunk on 25 June 1944 south-east of Torquay, in position . The U-boat was detected by the Royal Navy frigate , of the 5th Support Group, which immediately attacked with depth charges. The first attack knocked out all the lights aboard the U-boat, while the second ruptured the seals on the drive shafts, allowing water to rush in. The frigate's third depth charge run destroyed pipes, valves and electrical connections. Realizing that the situation was hopeless, Uhl ordered U-269 to surface, and prepared to abandon and scuttle the boat. The submarine surfaced within range of the frigate, which had just dropped a fourth set of depth charges. The U-boat began to sink immediately, while the survivors swam away or escaped on rafts. Bickerton picked up the 39 survivors. There were 13 dead, including Captain Uhl.

The wreck of U-269 was located in 1951, during a search for the missing British submarine , this was confirmed by nautical archaeologist Innes McCartney in 1999.

Wolfpacks
U-269 took part in three wolfpacks, namely:
 Eisbär (27 March – 15 April 1943) 
 Coronel (4 December 1943) 
 Dragoner (22 – 28 May 1944)

References

Bibliography

External links

U-boats commissioned in 1942
U-boats sunk in 1944
World War II submarines of Germany
German Type VIIC submarines
World War II shipwrecks in the English Channel
U-boats sunk by depth charges
U-boats sunk by British warships
1942 ships
Ships built in Bremen (state)
Maritime incidents in June 1944